Ichneumenoptera is a genus of moths in the family Sesiidae.

Species
Ichneumenoptera auripes (Hampson, [1893])
Ichneumenoptera caudata  Gorbunov & Arita, 1995
Ichneumenoptera daidai  Gorbunov & Arita, 2000
Ichneumenoptera duporti (Le Cerf, 1927)
Ichneumenoptera punicea  Gorbunov & Arita, 2000
Ichneumenoptera vietnamica  Gorbunov & Arita, 1995
Ichneumenoptera chrysophanes (Meyrick, 1887)
Ichneumenoptera commoni (Duckworth & Eichlin, 1974)
Ichneumenoptera xanthogyna (Hampson, 1919)
Ichneumenoptera cinnamomumi (Tosevski, 2005)

References

Sesiidae